Lieutenant General Barney Hlatswayo born 1958 was a South African Army officer who served as Chief of Joint Operations from 2018 until his retirement in 2019.

Military career

He served in the APLA in Tanzania and  integrated into the SANDF in 1994. He served as GOC Joint Operations HQ, Chief Director Operations, Chief Director Operational Development, Chief of Staff Joint Operations Division and finally Chief of Joint Operations from 2018. He retired with pension from the SANDF on 31 October 2019.

Awards and decorations

References

1958 births
South African Army generals
Living people